T. horridus may refer to:
 Triceratops horridus, a herbivorous dinosaur species of the Late Cretaceous Period in what is now North America
 Trichosirocalus horridus, a weevil species found in Europe

See also
 Horridus (disambiguation)